Tina Drazu is a Ugandan airline transport pilot, who serves as a First Officer at Uganda National Airlines Company, Uganda's national carrier airline, on the A330-841 equipment, since February 2021. Before that, since April 2019, she is a first officer on the CRJ 900 aircraft, at the same airline.

Background and education
Drazu was born in Arua District, in West Nile sub-region, in the Northern Region of Uganda. She obtained her Commercial pilot licence from Cape Flying Services in South Africa in 2010.

In 2020, Tina was among the pilots selected to undergo training on the A330-800 equipment. She successfully completed the type rating training at the Airbus Training Center in Miami, Florida, United States, in late 2020.

Career
Drazu spent one year and three months flying with Asante Airlines in South Sudan, from January 2011 until March 2012. She was then employed by Aerolink Uganda from July 2012 to April 2019, as a line pilot. In April 2019, she was hired by Uganda National Airlines Company, as one of a small number of female pilots at the airline.

As of February 2021, Drazu was one of five female aviators at Uganda Airlines, out of 50 pilots at the airline. She and Vanita Kayiwa were the only two females who were members of the cockpit crew on the A330-841 aircraft at Uganda Airlines, at that time. Tina Drazu and her co-worker Vanita Kayiwa are role models for young Ugandan women who want to pursue a career in aviation. The two have gone further than any woman before them.

See also
 Transport in Uganda
 List of airlines of Uganda
 List of airports in Uganda
 Michael Etyang
 Vanita Kayiwa

References

External links
 UTB ready to work with Uganda Airlines to promote country – Ajarova As of 23 April 2019.
 Meet The Two Women Pilots Flying The Uganda Airlines A330-800neo

Living people
Year of birth missing (living people)
Ugandan aviators
Women aviators
People from Arua District
People from Northern Region, Uganda
Commercial aviators
Women commercial aviators
People from West Nile sub-region